Trunk is a German language surname. It is a nickname for a heavy drinker – and may refer to:
Eddie Trunk (1964), American music historian, radio personality, talk show host, and author
Gustav Trunk (1871–1936), German politician
Jonny Trunk, English writer, broadcaster and DJ
Herman Trunk (1894–1963), American painter
Isaiah Trunk (1905–1981), Jewish historian
Penelope Trunk (1966), American businesswoman, author, and blogger
Peter Trunk (1936–1973), German jazz double-bassist
Richard Trunk (1879–1968), German composer, pianist, conductor, and critic

References 

German-language surnames
Surnames from nicknames
Jewish surnames